Shortland Street is a New Zealand television soap opera. It was first broadcast on 25 May 1992 and currently airs on television network TVNZ 2. The following is a list of characters that appeared on the show in 2017 by order of first appearance. All characters are introduced by the shows executive producer Maxine Fleming. The 25th season of Shortland Street began airing on 16 January 2017 and concluded on 18 December 2017.

Mason Coutts 

Mason Coutts, played by Colin Moy, made his first appearance in January 2017. Mason is Moy's second role on the show, having played Brett Valentine in 2004.

Mason is introduced as a new candidate for the role being Mayor of Ferndale. It later emerges that he is the father of troubled teen Jasper Coutts (Lachlan Forlong). He then meets Sass Connelly (Lucy Lovegrove) and the pair start a relationship much to the dislike of her half brother, Harry Warner (Reid Walker). Mason later moves Jasper to Ferndale High after being expelled from his previous school, St. Barts. Sass starts to assist with Mason's campaign for Mayor with her attending events alongside him frequently. Their relationship becomes physical and the two sleep together. After having sex, Sass falls asleep. While she is asleep Mason makes a suspicious phonecall on a separate phone. Later on, Mason wins the campaign to become the Mayor of Ferndale and during celebrations it is revealed that Mason was arranging the murder and burial of corrupt Detective Brent Cochrane underneath the foundation of a new building. Soon after, the pair marry, much to the dismay of Sass's family. Their relationship takes a turn when Sass starts to annoy Mason's long time love affair who acts as his assistant. Sass becomes upset when Mason dismisses her, but he re-assures her that everything is OK. Eventually, it is revealed that Mason is the criminal mastermind behind the death of Glenn Rickman (Will Wallace) and covering up the murder of Hayden Crowhurst (Aaron Jackson). Due to Mason's shady personality, TK Samuels (Benjamin Mitchell) starts to become suspicious of Mason. On the day of a volcanic eruption in Ferndale, Mason and Sass have a violent fight at their house. Sass hides from Mason, but he waits for her to come out. Sass later sees her brother Frank Warner (Luke Patrick) laying on the floor and thinks he may be dead. Angry, Sass grabs a knife and stabs him. Sass's friend Hawks Logan (Teone Kahu) turns up and comforts Sass. Mason begs Sass for help, but Sass refuses. Shortly afterwards, Frank wakes up and it is revealed he is not dead and Mason is treated for his injuries in Hospital. Mason is later sent to prison for his corrupt activity. In prison, he sends a gunman to shoot Frank and Sass's other brother Finn Connelly (Lukas Whiting) whilst Mason is on a boat with Jasper and Sass trapped after he escapes prison. They argue on board and Mason goes to throw Sass abroad but is interrupted by Jasper and gets injured. He suffers from his injuries and dies in Mason's arms. Mason blames Sass for his sons death and the pair have a physical struggle, Mason pulls Sass into the water and he reveals to her he sent a gunman to kill her family. Mason drowns and the boat sails away, leaving Sass in the ocean treading water.

Eve Reston 

Eve Reston, played by Jess Holly Bates, made her first screen appearance on 17 February 2017.

Unlucky in-love Boyd Rolleston (Sam Bunkall) was convinced to use a dating app by friend Drew McCaskill (Ben Barrington), and he was shocked when his one-night stand Eve was revealed as a new brain surgeon at the hospital. Adamant she was after a solely sexual relationship as she did not want to develop feelings, she propositioned Boyd to father children with her to create a perfect baby. Ultimately the two fell in love much to Eve's angst and she fell pregnant with twins. The hospital staff were shocked when deceased patient bodies started going missing and Eve lead speculation toward Deb Randal (Gabrielle Henderson) who was a recovering drug addict. Boyd began to notice suspicious behaviour in Eve and when following her one day, discovered she was the body-snatcher, operating on the bodies out of her father’s property where she was storing his brain. She sought to find medical miracles through researching dead patients. Eve pleaded with Boyd to keep her secret for their children's sake, but shortly after giving birth to their twin boys Remus and Romulus, she fled the country taking the babies with her.

In September 2018, Eve returned to Ferndale with her babies and pleaded with Boyd to operate as Romulus was ill. Boyd illegally organised the operation and operated on his son under an alias. Eve again fled the country but gave Boyd her contact details to ensure his children were safe. This was later rescinded when Boyd revealed this information to his policewoman girlfriend. In June 2020 Remus and Romulus were dropped to Boyd by a lawyer who informed him Eve was giving him full custody.

Eve later returned at the end of the year and abducted the twins.

Erin Landry

Erin Landry, played by Kayleigh Harworth, made her first appearance on 20 March 2017.

Erin is a PHD student, studying computers and the daughter of a patient named Betty. Noticing the head of the IT department Damo Johnson (Grant Lobban) was lonely, Leanne Miller  (Jennifer Ludlam) set up Erin and him for a date. However the death of Betty lead Erin to accuse her doctor TK Samuels (Benjamin Mitchell) of ill-practice and dump Damo due to her unstable state. Erin returned several months later having secured an IT job at the hospital and resumed her relationship with Damo. However, when she discovered that Leanne and Damo had dated, she became incredibly manipulative, leading to Leanne leaking her health documents showing she was infertile. Ultimately Damo became uncomfortable with Erin but she kidnapped him, attacked Ali, and fought Leanne. She was arrested and found to be suffering from a psychotic mental illness. When she returned in 2018, and while she was apologizing to Leanne, she had abdominal pain. Initially thought to be feinting, Harper found out that she is actually in labour. When a baby boy was born, Damo was revealed to be the father. Leanne's stance softened when Erin became stricken with Postpartum depression. Leanne also confided in Nicole that Eric, Nicole's brother, became a schizophrenic, partly due to Leanne's neglect when she had her depression.

Erin returned again in 2022 and attempted to become close with Damo again while helping him track down an internet hacker known as "The Fiend", who had stolen Damo's savings. However, it was quickly revealed that Erin herself was The Fiend and she fled Ferndale, leaving her and Damo's son Donny in Damo's care.

Dawn Robinson 

Dawn Robinson, played by Rebekah Randell, made her first appearance on 14 June 2017. Dawn is a nurse and is portrayed as a cheerful, optimistic and wholesome person. She also is said to see the good in every situation of which her colleagues can find "alternately refreshing and extremely frustrating".

Dawn, the eager newbie got offside with Sass Warner (Lucy Lovegrove) with her inane chatter and continued references to her boyfriend Dave.

She had joined the Followers Cult, fell in and out of love with Ali, she is currently a nurse and was GP's assistant to Dylan Reinheart. However, since Dylan made a move on her, their working relationship became awkward. After she left the cult, she also briefly worked as a female companion to sugar daddies so she can earn extra money. After the first stint failed while Ali was away, she tried to do that again when Ali is recovering from brain cancer tumour removal surgery. Ali died in April 2019, leaving Lulu with no birth parents, Dawn also became a widowed single step-parent.

She had a relationship with Marty, but in 2022, Dave, her first love returned for her, while she was about to leave to return to Cambridge and return to tend to the family farm, she was rushed back on July, 2022 when Damo was badly injured when he was hit by a bus. She was stood down to scrub in as a backup surgical nurse.

Gia Te Atakura

Gia Te Atakura (previously Sidney "Sid" Dutoit) arrives to the hospital as a teenage cardiac patient and impressed his doctor Esther Samuels (Ngahuia Piripi) with his dedication to sport despite his heart limitations. Esther soon grows close to Sid, breaking boundaries due to him being her patient and her developing romantic inclinations. Esther's uncle TK Samuels (Benjamin Mitchell) takes a liking to Sid and encourages his healthy lifestyle. However, when Sid's mother becomes aware of TK's relation to Esther she halted any progression of the relationship, eventually revealing to Esther that Sid is in fact TK's son from a one-night stand. TK discovered this but instead of informing Sid, let him move overseas to pursue a rowing career without having to worry about his father.

In November 2022 TK tries to contact Sid to reveal their relation, only for Sid's mother to reveal he had died 2 years prior. However it would be revealed not to be the case later that month as the new locum, Gia Te Atakura would be revealed to be Sid.

Gia would fall in love with Dr Rahu Parata (Zak Martin), with the two formally starting to date in the new year of 2023 in the aftermath of the Ferndale Bushfire which consumed Ferndale and burnt down the hospital. With the hospital reopening under Rebekah Anderson (Antonia Prebble) and her Brightshine cult, Gia would find herself offered a job in Chicago as a way to get rid of her due to being transgendered. Tk, whose cancer had returned would eventually be found cancer-free after which Gia finally acknowledged him as her father. At the same time, Rahu began having doubts about their relationship after receiving a transphobic rant from his brother Awatea (Kieran Foster) and the two would break up. Gia decided to accept the job in Chicago after all after saying her goodbyes.

Luke Whakapono

Luke Whakapono, played by Tammy Davis, made his first appearance in November 2017.

Upon Drew McCaskill (Ben Barrington) and Boyd Rolleston (Sam Bunkall) ending up lost in local bush and coming upon the cult followers, Luke is seen when his son Ezra screams about his father being "darkness". Ezra alleging that his father murdered one of his followers not long prior. When Hope, a member of Luke's cult is airlifted to the hospital, Luke ran into TK Samuels (Benjamin Mitchell), where it was revealed the two are half-brothers. Seemingly leaving peacefully once Ezra decides to stay with Drew and Boyd, Luke's manipulative nature is soon revealed when he attempts to force Hope to coax Ezra back to The Light. Ezra sends Hope back to the Followers, saying he has no interest in returning to his father. Infuriated by his son's disobedience. Luke disappears.

In the new year Luke returns and Dawn Robinson (Rebekah Palmer) decides to join The Light, wishing to turn her back on her previous life while not realising the true nature of the cult. Being hypnotised by Luke, Dawn returns to Ferndale where her odd behaviour is picked up on by her love interest, Ali Karim (Tane Williams-Accra). Dawn's mind control is eventually broken by her love for Ali and the two reconcile, infuriating Luke who then returns to trying to re-brainwash his son. Succeeding, TK goes to the Cult's compound where he confronts his brother about Ezra but is then drugged and brainwashed himself. Luke decides the time is right to enact his final plan, a slaughter of those the cult considers darkness, but before he can enact his plan, Drew and Boyd save TK and contact the police. While the police do nothing about Luke, Drew and Boyd escape with TK and leave. Luke is brought into hospital with a gunshot wound, inflicted by Ezra during an argument between the two. Despite the best efforts of the hospital's doctors, Luke dies from his wound. Seemingly from beyond the grave, Luke encourages his followers to commit suicide, succeeding in killing several members of the cult, while leaving Ezra, Dawn and TK still alive.

Ezra Whakapono

Ezra Whakapono, played by Dylan Poihipi, made his first appearance in November 2017.

First appearing when Boyd Rolleston (Sam Bunkall) and Drew McCaskill (Ben Barrington) are lost in the bush, Ezra, the son of Luke Whakapono (Tammy Davis) appears and accuses his father, the leader of The Light Cult of being "Darkness," implying his father has killed renegade followers before. Once Boyd and Drew leave, they find Ezra has stowed away and come back with them to the city. Deciding to take the young and naive cult member in, Boyd and Drew form a bond with Ezra who takes a liking to this strange new lifestyle. Befriending Leroy Raumati (Lionel Wellington) and Blue Nathan (Tash Keddy), Ezra learns more about the outside world, leading to humorous misunderstandings such as Ezra using Drew's money to hire a prostitute named Cinnamon and spending the night trying to remove her from "darkness" and yelling compliments to random young women about their bodies. After briefly moving to live with his uncle TK Samuels (Ben Mitchell), Ezra is eventually seduced back to his father's cult by the brainwashed Dawn Robinson (Rebekah Palmer.)

After Dawn undoes her brainwashing with the love of Ali Karim (Tane Williams-Accra), Ezra would once again confront his father after undoing his own brainwashing. After Drew and Boyd call the police once it is apparent the cult has been stockpiling guns in order to go to war with anyone they consider "darkness," nothing further is seen of the cult until Luke is admitted to Shortland Street with a gunshot wound to the chest, inflicted by Ezra in self-defence. Luke would succumb to his wounds not long afterward, after which those he had brainwashed saw his spirit demanding they sacrifice themselves to him. TK, Dawn and Ezra would resist, while other cult members would commit suicide by poisoned drink.

Ezra returned in August 2018 after staying with family in the South Island.

Others

References

External links
Characters and cast at the Official TVNZ website

2017
, Shortland Street